Amphilepidida is an order of echinoderms belonging to the class Ophiuroidea.

Families:
 Amphilepididae
 Amphilimnidae
 Amphiuridae
 Hemieuryalidae
 Ophiactidae
 Ophiolepididae
 Ophionereididae
 Ophiopholidae
 Ophiopsilidae
 Ophiothamnidae
 Ophiotrichidae

References

 
Ophiuroidea
Echinoderm orders